Scutus emarginatus is a species of sea snail, a marine gastropod mollusk in the family Fissurellidae, the keyhole limpets and slit limpets.

References

External links
 To Encyclopedia of Life
 To World Register of Marine Species

Fissurellidae
Gastropods described in 1851